Antonio Corazzi (born 16 December 1792 in Livorno, died April 27 1877 in Florence) was an Italian architect working in Poland from 1819 to 1847, mainly in Neoclassical style.

Biography
Antonio Corazzi was the son of an impresario of the Avalorati Theatre in Livorno. In 1811, after graduating from a Piarist high school, he joined the Reggia Accademia delle Belle Arti del Disegno in Florence, where he probably studied until 1816.

In 1818, the Staszic government of the Kingdom of Poland asked the government to Tuscany for a referral of an architect so in 1819 he came to Warsaw.

After 27 years in Poland, he returned to Florence. In 1847 he was appointed a member of the Academy of Fine Arts in Florence, where he designed, among other projects: the parliament (c. 1860), the Pantheon di Dante (c. 1865), and theaters in Alexandria and Copenhagen.

Architecture
His work very quickly adapted to the architectural climate of the Kingdom of Poland, especially in Warsaw, which, in the first decades of the 19th century, was still alive with the traditions of Stanisław's neoclassical era.

Corazzi's architectural creativity from 1819 to 1847 in Poland coincides with two major periods of architectural thought in the Warsaw School. 1815 to 1830 cover the period of the final formation of the neoclassical form, and from 1831 to 1850 the interpretations of these forms in the increasingly burgeoning Romanticism era.

The most characteristic of Corazzi 's work during the first period, were undertaken by him as part of the policy agenda of Minister Lubecki.

Corazzi had 50 projects in Poland, of which 45 were in Warsaw, among them several projects of urban planning work including Theatre Square and Bank Square in Warsaw. Almost all objects of a monumental design were made before 1831, mostly at the request of the government (among them, the Palace of the Sandomierz Commission (Pałac Komisji Województwa Sandomierskiego w Radomiu) in Radom).

Corazzi understood the need to establish an architectural tradition for Warsaw. Its buildings, particularly those that are on the tightly built-up streets merge into a unified whole. They are distinguished by only the elegance of line and decorative moderation, proper architecture of the 19th century, and the scale and proportion of the architecture of the Stanislaus period.

The pinnacle of his creativity and neo-classical architecture in Poland is the Grand Theatre.

In 1829 he became a Knight of the Order of Saint Stanislaus.

Major projects
 The Hołowczyca Palace in Warsaw (1820 – demolished 1912)
 The Palace of the Society of Friends of Science, the Staszic Palace (1820–1823)
 The Palace of the Government Commission of Internal Affairs and Police (the reconstructed Mostowski Palace, 1823–1824)
 The Water Board's offices in Warsaw (1824–1825)
 The Palace of the Ministry of Revenues and Treasury in Warsaw (1823–1825)
 The Sandomierski Palace in Radom (1825–1827)
 The Post Office in Siedlce (1827–1828)
 Polish Bank building and the Warsaw Stock Exchange (1825)
 Tenement John Kulikiewicza in Warsaw (Ujazdów Avenue 49, 1828–1829)
 The Grand Theatre in Warsaw with Salami Redutowymi (1825–1833)
 The Maria Konopnicka Museum in Suwałki (1826–1827 and 1835–1836)
 Śleszyński Palace in Warsaw (1836)
 Rastawiecki Palace in Dołhobyczów (1837)
 Real Gymnasium (1841)
 Monument to the officers and loyalists killed in the November Uprising in Warsaw (1841 – destroyed 1917)
 CK Norwid High School in Radzymin (1845)
 Palace of the Artichoke in Warsaw
 The former theatre building in Siedlce

See also
   Warszawa1939's listing of his work (in Polish but with original photos)

1792 births
1877 deaths
People from Livorno
19th-century Italian architects
Architects from Tuscany
Italian neoclassical architects
Italy–Poland relations
Italian emigrants to Poland